Steven R. "Steve" Stemler is a former Democratic member of the Indiana House of Representatives.  He represented the 71st District from 2006 to 2018. In 2017, Stemler announced that he would not run for reelection to the State House in 2018.

References

External links
Indiana State Legislature - Representative Steven R. Stemler Official government website
Steven R. Stemler for State Representative Official campaign website
Project Vote Smart - Representative Steven R. 'Steve' Stemler (IN) profile
Follow the Money - Steven R. Stemler
2008 2006 campaign contributions

Democratic Party members of the Indiana House of Representatives
Living people
People from Jeffersonville, Indiana
Year of birth missing (living people)